Giorgia Piccolin (born 15 January 1996) is an Italian table tennis player. Her highest career ITTF ranking was 74.

References

1996 births
Living people
Italian female table tennis players